The 1932 Texas Mines Miners football team, sometimes referred to as the "Muckers", was an American football team that represented the Texas School of Mines (now known as the University of Texas at El Paso) as an independent during the 1932 college football season. In its fourth season under head coach Mack Saxon, the team compiled a 7–3 record and outscored opponents by a total of 207 to 115.

Schedule

References

Texas Mines
UTEP Miners football seasons
Texas Mines Miners football